Panikos & Sokratis Zakakiou is a Cypriot association football club based in Zakaki, located in the Limassol District. Its stadium is the Zakaki Municipal Stadium. It has 3 participations in Cypriot Fourth Division.

References

Football clubs in Cyprus
Association football clubs established in 1959
1959 establishments in Cyprus